Aptunga vega is a species of snout moth. It was described by Herbert H. Neunzig in 1996. It is found in the Dominican Republic.

The length of the forewings is 11.5–13 mm.

Etymology
The specific epithet is derived from the type locality of La Vega.

References

Moths described in 1996
Phycitinae
Moths of the Caribbean